Love Talk (러브토크) is the second film by South Korean director Lee Yoon-ki. It tells the story of a group of expatriated South Koreans trying to adapt to living in the Los Angeles area. The film was shot entirely on location in California with Korean and American actors.

Awards
Lee Yoon-ki - Crystal Globe, 2005 Karlovy Vary International Film Festival (Nominated)

References

External links
 

2005 films
2005 drama films
Films directed by Lee Yoon-ki
South Korean drama films
Films set in Los Angeles
2000s Korean-language films
2000s English-language films
2000s South Korean films